"Crossroads" is the ninth episode of season one of the CBS drama Jericho, first aired on November 15, 2006.

Synopsis
Emily dreams of the morning of her wedding to Roger, then awakens and realizes that Roger is most likely dead. Meanwhile, outside of town, the Ravenwood mercenaries, led by Goetz, show up at the Richmond farm and steal gas for their two black Hummers.  Stanley confronts them, and Goetz asks if he knows Eric.  Stanley tells him he "can't help them", and then Goetz rounds up his men and leaves.  Stanley heads over to the Green house to warn Jake and Eric about them.

Anticipating the mercenaries' arrival, Gray, Jake, and Hawkins arrange an armed checkpoint, using inoperative cars to block the bridge leading out of Jericho in the direction of Rogue River. Soon the mercenaries arrive, and a confrontation takes place. A minor firefight erupts when a town citizen nervously fires off a shot. Although no one is hurt, Goetz gives an ultimatum: Clear the bridge in four hours, or the Ravenwood men will force their way through.

Eric causes a rift with his mother when he reveals to April his feelings for Mary. His mother tells April that she is welcome to stay with their family for as long as she likes—before Eric says that he will not be coming home.  He is still unaware that April is pregnant.

Jake comes to Emily in her last daydream of the episode. He repeats what Roger said in a previous daydream, telling her she knows why she can't leave Jericho, and for a moment, it looks like they are about to kiss. At the end, Emily is shown to be alone—she had only imagined Jake was present.

References

External links
"Crossroads" at CBS.com

2006 American television episodes
Jericho (2006 TV series) episodes